The Applied Science University (ASU, جامعة العلوم التطبيقية) is a university in Al Ekir, south of Manama within the Kingdom of Bahrain.

Founded by Bahraini academic Waheeb Al-Khaja, ASU was licensed by the Ministry of Education in 2004. Gulf Education Project W.L.L. Company, based in Bahrain, owns the university. It was one of the first private universities in Bahrain to teach in both the Arabic and the English languages.

ASU publishes an open access, peer reviewed journal on risk management called Applied Science Journal under the auspices of the Institute of Risk Management.

Academics
Among the programs offered by the university are eleven undergraduate programs and seven postgraduate programs. The university has colleges of administrative sciences, law, and arts and sciences.

Campus
The university relocated to a new campus in September 2013. Spread out over an area of 24,400 square meters, the new campus has been built to host up to 6,300 students. The main building has a clock tower.

Enrollment and faculty
According to a report published by the Bahraini Ministry of Education, there were 1,623 students enrolled at the time of the report's release in January 2012. In regards to university officials, there were 75 faculty members and 41 administrative staff members. Enrollment numbers increased to approximately 2,400 in 2014 and 3,254 in 2019.

Partnerships
ASU signed a memorandum of understanding with Cardiff Metropolitan University in 2014. In 2016, in a collaborative partnership between the two universities, the London South Bank University launched a new Engineering School at ASU.

Colleges
 College of Administrative Sciences
 College of Law
 College of Arts and Science
 College of Engineering

References

External links
 Applied Science University (Bahrain) website
 Applied Science University (Bahrain) Calendar
 Applied Science University (Bahrain) Student portal
 Applied Science University (Bahrain) News
 Applied Science University (Bahrain) Programmes
 Applied Science University (Bahrain) Apply Now
 Careers

2004 establishments in Bahrain
Educational institutions established in 2004
Universities in Bahrain
Buildings and structures in Sitra
University and college buildings completed in 2013
Science and technology in Bahrain
Scientific organisations based in Bahrain
Technical universities and colleges
Clock towers in Bahrain